Pretoria Capitals is a South African professional Twenty20 franchise cricket team that first competed in the inaugural season of SA20 tournament. The team is based in Pretoria, South Africa, and was formed in 2022. The team's home-ground is the Centurion Park Cricket ground. The team is coached by Graham Ford.

The franchise is owned by JSW Group.

Current squad
The side's squad for the first season of the competition was:
 Players with international caps are listed in bold

Statistics

Most runs

Most wickets

Administration and support staff

References

External links
 Pretoria Capitals team website
 SA20 Official Team Website

Cricket in South Africa
2022 establishments in South Africa
Sport in Pretoria
Cricket clubs established in 2022
Sports clubs in South Africa
SA20
JSW Group